Husqvarna FF is a football club in Huskvarna, Sweden. The team is sponsored by the Husqvarna AB.

History
Husqvarna FF was founded on 3 February 1987 following the merger of the men's association football sections of Husqvarna IF and Huskvarna Södra IS. In its early years the new club played in Divisions 2 and 3. The club's fortunes improved in 1998 when the club finished with nine points ahead of Myresjö IF to win Division 2 Östra Götaland and gain promotion to Division 1 Södra, the second tier of Swedish football.  However their stay in Division 1 was short-lived and they were relegated at the end of the 1999 season.

Since 2006 the club has been playing in Division 1 Södra which is now the third tier of the Swedish football league system except the 2012 season when they played in Division 2 Östra Götaland. In 2013, they were promoted to Superettan which is the second tier in Swedish football.

Notable coaches
 Glenn Ståhl (2009–2010)
 Niclas Tagesson (2011–present)

Season to season

Current squad

Management

Technical staff

Achievements

League
 Division 1 Södra: 2013

Footnotes
A Current youth players who at least have sat on the bench in a competitive match.

References

External links
Husqvarna FF

 
Football clubs in Jönköping County
Sport in Huskvarna
Association football clubs established in 1987
1987 establishments in Sweden